Ramiro Nicolás Cristóbal Calderón (born 10 April 1996) is a Uruguayan footballer who play as defensive midfielder for River Plate.

References

External links
Ramiro Cristóbal at Fox Sports

1996 births
Living people
Uruguayan footballers
Uruguayan expatriate footballers
Uruguay youth international footballers
Association football midfielders
Defensor Sporting players
C.A. Rentistas players
Atlético Tucumán footballers
Club Atlético River Plate (Montevideo) players
Uruguayan Primera División players
Uruguayan expatriate sportspeople in Argentina
Expatriate footballers in Argentina